Balabyne is an urban-type settlement in the Zaporizhzhia Raion (district) of Zaporizhzhia Oblast in southern Ukraine. Balabyne is the administrative center of the Balabyne Council, a local government area. It belongs to Kushuhum settlement hromada, one of the hromadas of Ukraine. Population: . In 2001, population was 5,668 according to the census.

The settlement was first founded in 1777 as the village of Petrivska. In 1938, it was renamed to Balabyne and given the status of an urban-type settlement. It is located on the left bank of the Kakhovka Reservoir, just south of Zaporizhzhia's Komunarskyi District.

References

Zaporizhzhia Raion
Populated places established in 1777
Populated places on the Dnieper in Ukraine
Urban-type settlements in Zaporizhzhia Raion